Alessandro Monaco (born 4 February 1998) is an Italian racing cyclist, who currently rides for UCI ProTeam .

Major results

2015
 7th Trofeo Citta di Loano
2016
 1st Overall Tre Giorni Orobica
1st Stage 3
 3rd Trofeo Citta di Loano
 4th Overall Giro della Lunigiana
2018
 6th Overall Toscana-Terra di Ciclismo
 8th Overall Giro della Valle d'Aosta
2019
 8th Overall Grand Prix Priessnitz spa
 8th G.P. Palio del Recioto
 10th GP Capodarco
 10th Gran Premio Sportivi di Poggiana
2021 
 6th Overall Adriatica Ionica Race
2022
 5th Grand Prix Alanya

References

External links

1998 births
Living people
Italian male cyclists
Sportspeople from the Province of Brindisi
Cyclists from Apulia